Roy Allen may refer to:
 Roy Allen (pilot) (1918–1991), United States Army Air Forces bomber pilot
 Roy W. Allen (1882–1968), American entrepreneur
 Roy Allen (footballer) (1901–2001), Australian rules football player and umpire
 Sir R. G. D. Allen (Roy George Douglas Allen, 1906–1983), English economist, mathematician and statistician